Orage is a 1938 French drama film directed by Marc Allégret. The film stars Charles Boyer and Michèle Morgan.

It tells the story of the mistress of an engineer who has a pregnant wife.

Principal cast
Charles Boyer as  André Pascaud 
Michèle Morgan as  Françoise Massart 
Lisette Lanvin as  Gisèle Pascaud 
Robert Manuel as  Gilbert 
Jean-Louis Barrault as  The African

External links

1938 films
Films directed by Marc Allégret
French black-and-white films
French drama films
Films scored by Georges Auric
French films based on plays
1938 drama films
1930s French films